, also known as daa saang zong/da sheng zhuang (Cantonese/Mandarin romanisation) in China, myosade (မြို့စတေး) in Burma, and tumbal proyek in Indonesia, is a cultural practice of human sacrifice in East and Southeast Asia of premature burial before the construction of buildings. Hitobashira was practised formerly in Japan as a form of human sacrifice. A person was buried alive under or near large-scale buildings like dams, bridges and castles, as a prayer to Shinto gods.  It was believed this would protect the building from being destroyed by natural disasters such as floods or by enemy attacks. Hitobashira can also refer to workers who were buried alive under inhumane conditions.

Da sheng zhuang
Legend has it that the practice of da sheng zhuang was first proposed by Lu Ban. It was believed that the moving of soil during large scale construction would destroy the fengshui of the land, and anger the ghosts of people who have died unjustly, causing accidents during construction. Da sheng zhuang was proposed to suppress such evils, and reduce the number of incidents during construction.

However, the earliest archeological evidence of da sheng zhuang is a case discovered in the Dongzhao excavation in Zhengzhou, Henan Province, where the remains of an infant used in the foundation of the Erlitou culture city were found.

There is also a legend that the construction of bridges in the ancient era required the sacrifices of both a young girl and a boy. The boy would be buried within a pier at the front of the bridge, while the girl would be buried within the pier at the back of the bridge.

During the reign of Chunghye of Goryeo, a rumour spread within the capital city of Kaesong that he had planned to sacrifice dozens of infants as a foundation for a his new palace, causing chaos as the people of Kaesong fled en masse.

During the construction of a levee at Dahu Park in Taiwan under Qing rule, it is said that there was a live burial of an elderly beggar. The temple set up for him, Laogongci (老公祠), can still be visited today.

There are rumours that daa saang zong was prevalent in pre-WWII Hong Kong. The phrase 'daa saang zong' was used by parents in Hong Kong during the 1930s to scare disobedient children. In 2006, discussion regarding daa saang zong was reignited when a large number of infant remains were discovered during water pipe laying at Princess Margaret Road, Ho Man Tin. However, the area around Ho Man Tin used to house Chinese and Muslim cemeteries which were since moved, and it has been said that the infant remains were not from incidents of daa saang zong, but rather remains that were not relocated.

Ex-head of Tin Tin Daily News, Wai Kee-shun, claimed that the construction of Haizhu Bridge, Guangzhou involved the practice of daa saang zong.

Following the modernization of Asia, some areas started using the sacrifice of chicken as an alternative to da sheng zhuang.

Hitobashira
Some of the earliest written records of hitobashira can be found in the Nihon Shoki (The Chronicles of Japan). One story centered on Emperor Nintoku (323 A.D.) discusses the overflowing of the Kitakawa and Mamuta Rivers. Protection against the torrent was beyond the ability of the stricken populace. The Emperor had a divine revelation in his dream to the effect that there was a person named Kowakubi in the province of Musashi and a person called Koromono-ko in the province of Kawachi. If they should be sacrificed to deities of the two rivers respectively, then the construction of embankments would be easily achieved. Kowakubi was subsequently thrown into the torrent of the Kitakawa river, with a prayer offered. After the sacrifice the embankment was constructed, Koromono-ko however escaped being sacrificed.

The Yasutomi-ki, a diary from the 15th century, documents the famous tradition of "Nagara-no Hitobashira". According to the tradition, a woman who was carrying a boy on her back was caught while she was passing along the river Nagara and was buried at the place where a large bridge was then to be built. Hitobashira traditions were almost always practiced in conjunction with the building of complex, dangerous, often water-related projects, such as bridges. The stories of hitobashira were believed to inspire a spirit of self-sacrifice in people.

Stories of hitobashira and other human sacrifices were common in Japan as late as the sixteenth century.

Architectural examples

Maruoka Castle

Maruoka Castle is one of the oldest surviving castles in Japan and is rumored to have been constructed with a human pillar which can be found in the legend of "O-shizu, Hitobashira".

When Shibata Katsutoyo, the nephew of Shibata Katsuie, was building a castle in Maruoka, the stone wall of the castle kept collapsing no matter how many times it was piled up. There was one vassal who suggested that they should make someone a human sacrifice (hitobashira). O-shizu, a one-eyed woman who had two children and lived a poor life, was selected as the Hitobashira. She resolved to become one on the condition that one of her children be made a samurai. She was buried under the central pillar of the castle keep. Soon after that the construction of the castle keep was successfully completed. But Katsutoyo was transferred to another province and her son was not made a samurai. Her spirit felt resentful and made the moat overflow with spring rain when the season of cutting algae came in April every year. People called it, "the rain caused by the tears of O-shizu's sorrow" and erected a small tomb to soothe her spirit. There was a poem handed down,"The rain which falls when the season of cutting algae comes Is the rain reminiscent of the tears of the poor O-shizu's sorrow". It has been commented that the instability of the walls of Maruoka Castle was likely caused by the design of the castle. Although built in the Momoyama period (1575-1600) the design is more indicative of earlier fortresses, the steep base features random-style stone piling which is suggested as the source of instability in the walls which may have led to the use of a human pillar during its construction.

Matsue Ohashi Bridge

The Matsue Ohashi Bridge according to legend used a human sacrifice in its construction. The nearby park is named Gensuke in honour of the human sacrifice along with a memorial dedicated to the victims who died during the bridge's construction.

When Horio Yoshiharu, the great general who became daimyō of Izumo in the Keichō era, first undertook to put a bridge over the mouth of this river, the builders laboured in vain; for there appeared to be no solid bottom for the pillars of the bridge to rest upon. Millions of great stones were cast into the river to no purpose, for the work constructed by day was swept away or swallowed up by night. Nevertheless, at last the bridge was built, but the pillars began to sink soon after it was finished; then a flood carried half of it away and as often as it was repaired so often it was wrecked. It was then decided that a human sacrifice would be made to appease the vexed spirits of the flood. It was determined that the first man who should cross the bridge wearing a hakama without a machi (a stiff piece of material to keep the folds of the garment perpendicular and neat-looking) should be put under the bridge. A man named Gensuke, who lived on Saikamachi street, passed over the bridge without a machi in his hakama and was taken to be sacrificed. Gensuke was buried alive in the river-bed below the place of the middle pillar, where the current is most treacherous, and thereafter the bridge remained immovable for three hundred years.  The middle-most pillar of the bridge was for three hundred years called by his name: "Gensuke-bashira". Some believe the name Gensuke was not the name of a man but the name of an era, corrupted by local dialect. The legend is so profoundly believed, that when the new bridge was built in 1891, many local rural residents were afraid to come to town due to rumors that a new victim was needed, and would be chosen from among them.

It is said this event occurred in 1608.

Matsue Castle

According to legend the Matsue Castle is also said to have been constructed on a human sacrifice that was buried under the castle's stone walls. Her name has never been recorded, and nothing concerning her is remembered except that she is thought to have been a beautiful young maiden who was fond of dancing and is referred to as simply the maiden of Matsue.  After the castle was built, a law was passed forbidding any girl to dance in the streets of Matsue because the hill Oshiroyama  would shudder and the castle would shake from "top to bottom".

Other examples
In Wanouchi, Gifu during the 1754 Horeki River Improvement Incident which involved the difficult and dangerous construction of river embankments, a local retainer voluntarily gave his life by remaining under the rushing water in order to keep a foundation pillar from moving until it could be secured from above. As well as aiding in the construction, this sacrifice was also treated as an offering to the gods ensuring the successful completing of the project (i.e., a hitobashira).

Related practices
This involves the forcing of a child into the exit hole of a dam during a flood, in the belief that this would stop the flood. The phrase sak¹ dau⁶ lung¹ is in common use in modern Cantonese, but is only used to refer to children. The ancient practice has been proposed to be the phrase's etymology.

Another related practice relates to the production of bronzeware and pottery, where ritual sacrifices were referred to as toulushen 投爐神 (thrown to stove deity) or lushengu 爐神姑 (stove goddess) and venerated. The casting of the Bell of King Seongdeok in Gyeongju is said to have involved this practice.

See also

References

Human sacrifice
Japanese culture
Religious rituals
Premature burials
Traditional East Asian Architecture